Blur are an English rock band formed of singer–keyboardist Damon Albarn, guitarist Graham Coxon, bassist Alex James and drummer Dave Rowntree. The band are best known for popularising the Britpop movement. However, their later material was more influenced by Indie Rock, Electronic and Hip Hop music. After a hiatus, the band reformed in 2009.

The band have released eight studio albums: Leisure (1991), Modern Life Is Rubbish (1993), Parklife (1994), The Great Escape (1995), Blur (1997), 13 (1999), Think Tank (2003) and The Magic Whip (2015). Out of 17 nominations, Blur have won 5 Brit Awards, making them one of the most successful acts at the ceremony. Four of Blur's Brits were received in 1995: the most any artist has won in a single ceremony. The other was received in 2012 for outstanding contribution to music. Blur have also been nominated twice for the prestigious Mercury Prize.

Artrocker Awards

|-
| 2012 || Blur 21 || REISSUE OF THE YEAR ||

The Best Awards
The Best Awards celebrate the very best of British marketing. 

|-
| 1996 || "The Universal" || Best Video ||

Brit Awards
The Brit Awards are the British Phonographic Industry's annual pop music awards. Blur have won 5 Brits out of 17 nominations, making them one of the most successful winners at the ceremony. Four of Blur's Brits were received in 1995: the most any artist has won in a single ceremony. Nominations for production work are also featured on this list.

|-
| rowspan="5" | 1995 || Blur || British Group || 
|-
| Parklife || British Album of the Year || 
|-
| "Girls & Boys" || rowspan="2" | British Single of the Year || 
|-
| rowspan="2" | "Parklife" || 
|-
| rowspan="3" | British Video of the Year || 
|-
| rowspan="5" | 1996 || "The Universal" || 
|-
| rowspan="2" | "Country House" || 
|-
| British Single of the Year || 
|-
| The Great Escape || British Album of the Year || 
|-
| Blur || British Group || 
|-
| rowspan="2" | 1998 || rowspan="2" | "Song 2" || British Single of the Year || 
|-
| British Video of the Year || 
|-
| rowspan="2" | 2000 || Blur || British Group || 
|-
| "Tender" || British Single of the Year || 
|-
| 2004 || Think Tank || British Album of the Year || 
|-
| 2012 || rowspan="2" | Blur || Outstanding Contribution to Music  || 
|-
| 2016 || British Group ||

British Animation Awards
 

|-
| 2004 || "Good Song" || Best Video ||

D&AD Awards
 

|-
| 2000 || "Coffee & TV" || Pop Promos / Best Direction (Silver)|| 
|-
| rowspan="4" | 2004 || rowspan="2" | "Good Song" || Best Animation (Silver)|| 
|-
| Best Direction (Silver)|| 
|-
| rowspan="2" | "Out of Time" || Best Cinematography (Silver)|| 
|-
| Best Editing (Silver)|| 
|-

Danish Music Awards
 

|-
| 2004 || Think Tank || Best Album ||

Edinburgh Film Festival
 

|-
| 2004 || "Good Song" || McLaren Animation Award ||

FOCAL Awards
 

|-
| 2004 || "Out of Time" || Best Use Of Footage In A Pop Music Promo ||

Gaffa Awards
 

|-
| rowspan="3" | 2004 || Blur || Best International Band || 
|-
| Damon Albarn || Best International Singer || 
|-
| Blur || Best Live Act || 
|-

Grammy Awards
The Grammy Awards are presented annually by the National Academy of Recording Arts and Sciences of the United States for outstanding achievements in the record industry. Blur have received one nomination.

|-
| 2011 || "No Distance Left to Run" || Best Long Form Music Video || 
|-

GQ Awards

|-
| 2003 || Blur || Band Of The Year || 
|-
|-
| 2015 || Blur || Band Of The Year || 
|-

Ivor Novello Awards
The Ivor Novello Awards, named after the Cardiff born entertainer Ivor Novello, are awards for songwriting and composing. Blur have received one award.

|-
| 1996 || Damon Albarn || Songwriters of the Year || *
|-

Shared with Noel Gallagher

Mercury Prize
The Mercury Prize is an annual music prize awarded for the best album from the United Kingdom or Ireland. Blur have received two nominations.

|-
| 1994 || Parklife || Mercury Prize || 
|-
| 1999 || 13 || Mercury Prize ||

MOJO Awards
 

|-
| 2009 || Blur || Inspiration Award ||

Music Week Awards
 

|-
| 2000 || "Coffee & TV" || Best Pop Video || * 
|-

MTV Europe Music Awards
The MTV Europe Music Awards (EMA's) were established in 1994 by MTV Europe to celebrate the most popular music videos in Europe. Blur have received one awards from two nominations. 

|-
| 1994 || "Girls & Boys" || Best Song || 
|-
|1999 || "Coffee & TV" || Best Video || 
|-

MTV Video Music Awards
The MTV Video Music Awards (VMA's) were established in 1984 by MTV to honor the best in music videos. Blur have received three nominations. 

|-
| rowspan="2" | 1997 || rowspan="2" | "Song 2" || Best Alternative Video || 
|-
| Best Group Video  || 
|-
| 2000 || "Coffee & TV" || Best Breakthrough Video ||

Music Week Sync Awards
The Music Week Awards are UK's only music awards that recognise labels, publishing, live, retail, A&R, radio, marketing and PR, founded by the trade paper Music Week

|-
|2016
| "Song 2" (Madeon Remix)
| Trailer (Video Game)
|

NME Awards
The NME Awards are an annual music awards show, founded by the music magazine NME. Blur have won 11 awards.

|-
| rowspan="5" | 1995 || Parklife || Best LP (voted by NME readers) || 
|-
| "Girls & Boys" || NME Single Of The Year || 
|-
| rowspan="2" | Blur || Live Act Of The Year || 
|-
| Best Band || 
|-
| "Parklife" || Best Video || 
|-
| rowspan="3" | 1998 || Blur || Best Band || 
|-
| Blur || Best Album || 
|-
| "Song 2" || Best Video || 
|-
| rowspan="6" | 2000 || rowspan="2" | Blur || Best Band || 
|-
| Best Live Act || 
|-
| "Coffee & TV" || rowspan="2" | Best Video || 
|-
| "No Distance Left to Run" || 
|-
| "Tender" || Best Single || 
|-
| 13 || Best Album || 
|-
| rowspan="1" | 2010 || Blur - Hyde Park || Best Live Event || 
|-
| rowspan="2" | 2013 || Blur 21 || Best Re-Issue || 
|-
| Blur || Best Live Band || 
|-
| rowspan="2" | 2016 || "Ong Ong" || Best Video|| 
|-
| "New World Towers" || Best Music Film|| 
|-
|-
| rowspan="1" | 2017 || Leisure || Best Reissue|| 
|-

PRS for Music
 

|-
| 2009 || Blur || Heritage Award ||

Q Awards
The Q Awards are the UK's annual music awards run by the music magazine Q.

|-
| rowspan="2" | 1994 || Parklife || Best Album || 
|-
| Stephen Street || Best Producer || 
|-
| 1995 || The Great Escape  || Best Album || 
|-
| rowspan="2" |1999 || Blur || Best Act in the World Today || 
|-
| William Orbit|| Best Producer || 
|-
| 2000 || Blur || Best Act in the World Today || 
|-
|  rowspan="3" | 2003 || Think Tank  || Best Album || 
|-
| Blur/Ben Hillier || Best Producer || 
|-
| Blur || Best Act In The World Today  || 
|-
| 2009 || Blur || Best Live Act || 
|-
|  rowspan="2" | 2012 || rowspan="2" | Blur || Best Live Act || 
|-
| Best Act In The World Today || 
|-
|  rowspan="2" | 2015|| The Magic Whip  || Best Album || 
|-
| Blur || Best Act In The World Today  ||

Smash Hits Awards
The Smash Hits Poll Winners Party was an awards ceremony voted by the readers of Smash Hits magazine. Blur have receive two awards out of two nominations. 

|-
| 1994 || Parklife || Best Album || 
|-
| 1994 || Blur || Best Alternative Band || 
|-

South Bank Show Awards
The South Bank Show Awards are given to achievements in the arts. Blur have received one award. 

|-
| 2004 || Think Tank || Best Album ||

UK Festival Awards
 

|-
| rowspan="3" |2009 || "Tender" || Anthem Of The Summer || 
|-
| Blur || Best Headline Performance || 
|-
| Damon Albarn || Festival Fitty Of The Year - Boys ||

Recognition 

In July 2009, "Song 2" was voted #12 in Triple J Hottest 100 of All Time.

References

Awards
Lists of awards received by British musician
Lists of awards received by musical group